Saint-Philibert is the name of several communities around the world:

Canada
Saint-Philibert, in the province of Quebec

France
Saint-Philibert, in the Côte-d'Or department
Saint-Philibert, in the Morbihan department
 Saint-Philibert disaster